Good High is the debut album by the Atlanta, Georgia-based band Brick. Released in 1976, it topped the Billboard R&B albums chart. The single, "Dazz", was a number-one song on the R&B singles chart and also reached number three on the Hot 100 chart.

Track listing
"Here We Come" - (Jimmy "Lord" Brown)  2:52
"Music Matic"  - (Ray Ransom)  3:00
"Dazz" - (Ray Ransom, Eddie Irons, Regi Hargis) 5:37
"Can't Wait" - (Ray Ransom, Eddie Irons, Regi Hargis)  3:21
"Southern Sunset" - (Ray Ransom)  4:03
"Good High" - (Ray Ransom, Eddie Irons, Regi Hargis)  3:11
"Brick City" - (Donald Nevins)  6:19
"Sister Twister" - (Donald Nevins, Jimmy "Lord" Brown, Ray Ransom, Eddie Irons, Regi Hargis)  3:33
"That's What It's All About" - (Jimmy "Lord" Brown)  4:16

Personnel
Jimmy "Lord" Brown - saxophone, flute, trombone, trumpet, vocals
Donald Nevins - keyboards, vocals
Ray Ransom - bass, vocals
Eddie Irons - drums, vocals
Regi Hargis - guitar, vocals
Atlanta Symphony Players – Benjamin Picone, David Arenz, Frank Walton, Heidi Nitchie, Larry LeMaster, Patricio Salvatierra, Willard Shull - strings

Charts

Singles

See also
List of number-one R&B albums of 1977 (U.S.)

References

External links
 Brick - Good High at Discogs

1976 debut albums
Brick (band) albums
Bang Records albums